Boxley Building is a historic commercial building located at Roanoke, Virginia.  It was built in 1922, and is an eight-story, granite and beige brick building. It consists of a granite base on the first story, a six-story brick shaft and an unusually fine top-story ornamented cornice with terra cotta panels and finely detailed copper cornice.  It was built by William Wise Boxley (1861-1940), builder, developer, quarry owner, railroad contractor, and mayor of Roanoke.

It was listed on the National Register of Historic Places in 1984.

References

Commercial buildings on the National Register of Historic Places in Virginia
Commercial buildings completed in 1922
Buildings and structures in Roanoke, Virginia
National Register of Historic Places in Roanoke, Virginia
Individually listed contributing properties to historic districts on the National Register in Virginia